Valuyeh-ye Olya (also Romanized as Valūyeh-ye ‘Olyā; also known as Valūyeh-ye Bālā) is a village in Poshtkuh Rural District, Chahardangeh District, Sari County, Mazandaran Province, Iran. At the 2006 census, its population was 114, in 28 families.

References 

Populated places in Sari County